Martin Henry Colnaghi (16 November 1821 – 1908) was a British art dealer for the London-based Colnaghi.

Personal life
He was born on 16 November 1821 at 23 Cockspur Street, London, and baptised Martino Enrico Luigi Gaetano. He was the eldest son of Martin Colnaghi and his wife, Fanny Boyce Clarke, and a grandson of  Paul Colnaghi of Pall Mall.

Colnaghi had three marriages, but no children.
Sarah Nash
Elizabeth Maxwell Howard (died 1888)
On 17 October 1889, he married Amy Mary Smith, daughter of the artist George Smith

Colnaghi died on 27 June 1908, aged 86, at the Marlborough Gallery, and was buried on the eastern side of Highgate Cemetery.

Legacy
Colnaghi bequeathed four paintings to London's National Gallery, Lorenzo Lotto's Madonna and Child and Saints, Philips Wouwerman's The Gypsies, Aert van der Neer's Dawn, and Thomas Gainsborough's The Bridge. He stipulated that after his wife's death, £80,000 should go to the National Gallery, to buy art, to form the Martin Colnaghi bequest.

References

1821 births
1908 deaths
Burials at Highgate Cemetery
Art dealers from London
People from Westminster
English people of Italian descent
19th-century English businesspeople